Amt Seelow-Land is an Amt ("collective municipality") in the district of Märkisch-Oderland, in Brandenburg, Germany. Its seat is in Seelow, itself not part of the Amt.

The Amt Seelow-Land consists of the following municipalities:
Falkenhagen
Fichtenhöhe
Gusow-Platkow
Lietzen
Lindendorf
Neuhardenberg
Vierlinden

Demography

References

Seelow-Land
Märkisch-Oderland